Kristoffer Andersen (born 9 December 1985) is a retired Belgian footballer. Andersen has both the Danish and Belgian citizenship.

Early life
Andersen is the son of Henrik Andersen and a Belgian mother. He was born in 1985 in the Brussels suburb of Etterbeek, as Henrik Andersen at the time was playing at Anderlecht. As Henrik Andersen 1990 moved to 1. FC Köln, the family moved to Eupen, which lies near the border to Germany. After Henrik Andersen finished his career in 1998, the family remained in Eupen.

Playing career
At the end of the 2018-19 season, Andersen retired.

References

External links
 
 

1985 births
Living people
Belgian footballers
Belgian people of Danish descent
Danish people of Belgian descent
Danish men's footballers
VfR Aalen players
Association football midfielders
MSV Duisburg players
Borussia Mönchengladbach II players
R.W.D.M. Brussels F.C. players
K.A.S. Eupen players
VfL Osnabrück players
FC Ingolstadt 04 players
Alemannia Aachen players
SC Fortuna Köln players
2. Bundesliga players
3. Liga players
Belgian expatriate sportspeople in Germany
Danish expatriate sportspeople in Germany
Expatriate footballers in Germany
Alemannia Aachen managers
Belgian football managers
Regionalliga managers
People from Etterbeek
Footballers from Brussels